Victoria Fuller may refer to:

Victoria Fuller (artist), artist and sculptor 
Victoria Fuller (model), glamour model, artist, and actress